Nick Emad Tarabay (born 28 August 1975) is a Lebanese-born American actor. He is known for portraying Ashur on the Starz television series Spartacus and Cotyar on the Amazon Prime Video science fiction television series The Expanse.

Early life 
Tarabay was born in Beirut, Lebanon, to a large family. His parents still reside in Lebanon, as does his younger brother and a large extended family of cousins, uncles and aunts. He moved to New York after high school. As a clothing salesman, he worked for Hugo Boss and Gucci, while studying acting at the T. Schreiber Studio and appearing in Off-Off-Broadway plays. He moved to Los Angeles in 2004, where he studied under Larry Moss and appeared in their studio's staging of John Patrick Shanley's Danny and the Deep Blue Sea.

Career 
Tarabay made his television debut as an extra in an episode of Sex and the City (2000). He got another minor role in The Sopranos (2001–2004), where he played the role of Matush, a drug dealer. He also played the role of The Captor in David Ellison's 2005 dramatic short film When All Else Fails. As well he played a role in the 2008's television series Crash, in which he played the character Axel Finet, a hot-tempered police lieutenant. He was not brought back for the second season.

Tarabay played a central supporting role in the Starz series Spartacus: Blood and Sand in the character of Ashur, a former gladiator who was injured and now is used as an agent and spy. He also appears in the prequel miniseries Spartacus: Gods of the Arena with the same role prior to his injury, as well as the sequel to Blood and Sand, Spartacus: Vengeance. In 2013, he appeared as Klingon patrol officer in J. J. Abrams' Star Trek Into Darkness.

Tarabay played a role in the seventh season of USA Network's Burn Notice as "Dexter Gamble." Additionally, Tarabay portrays Reiken in the Brent Ryan Green film The Veil. In 2014, he joined the cast of the CW series Arrow as supervillain Digger Harkness/Captain Boomerang. Tarabay served as a recurring character in the fourth season of Person of Interest as "Devon Grice," an ISA operative. He joined the TV show The Expanse in its second season. He voiced the role of Haluk in Bioware's 2019 video game Anthem. In October 2020 he was cast as the villain Eclipso in the second season of the CW television series Stargirl.

Filmography

References

External links
 
 

1975 births
Living people
Male actors from Beirut
American male television actors
American people of Lebanese descent